Anda Adam (born 27 April 1980) is a Romanian singer and model. She is best known for her singles "My Love on You" and "Panda Madam". Anda began her music career in 1999, after collaborating with Romanian band R.A.C.L.A. on the songs "Nu mă uita" and "Fiesta" for their EP Nu mă uita. This inspired Anda to begin her own music career, releasing her debut EP Ca Între Fete later that year. In 2003, she released her secpmd EP Doar cu tine. Her debut album, Confidențial, was released on 14 April 2005, and featured the successful singles "Ce ți-aș face (Selecta)", "Ajutor", and "Nai, Nai". The album has sold over 20,000 copies in Romania as of 2007, being certified platinum. Her second album, Queen of Hearts, was released in February 2008, featuring the singles "Punani", and "Sufletul Meu", which became one of the most played songs on the radio back then. Her single "My Love On You" was released on 26 November 2009, which became the singer's biggest hit, reaching number one on Turkey and seven in Romania. Her third studio album, AMO was released in September 2013. The album featured singles that charted in both Romania and Turkey, such as "My Love On You", "Panda Madam", "Feel", "Show Me", "Say Goodbye", and many others.

In 2018 the artist was chosen by Walt Disney Pictures Romania to sign the main theme from the movie Kronk's New Groove.

Discography

Studio albums

EPs

Singles
As lead artist

As featured artist
Madam
Can U Feel Love
World moves on
Forever young
Wanna love you
My way
Să Înceapă Gălăgia!
King
La Pachanga
Diva

She has charted in Romania with several songs in recent years:
 My Love on You – #27 in 2010
 Madam (with Sasha Lopez) – No. 85 in 2010
 Can U Feel Love (with Kourosh Tazmini) – No. 75 in 2012
 Amo – No. 46 in 2013
 Dacă ar fi – No. 59 in 2013
 Seri de mai (with C.R.B.L.) – No. 59 in 2015

Honors and awards
 Romanian Music Awards: Best Performance (win), Best Female (nominee), Best Pop (nominee): 2010

Notes

References

External links

 
 Anda Adam on discogs
 Anda Adam on starmania.ro

1980 births
21st-century Romanian women singers
21st-century Romanian singers
Musicians from Bucharest
Living people
Models from Bucharest